Passion Killers may refer to:
 Passion Killers (film), 1999 television film produced by Andy Harries
 Passion Killers (play), 1994 play by John Godber
Passion Killers, 2008 novel by Linda Regan